Thoroughfare Gap is the fifth studio album by American singer-songwriter Stephen Stills, released in 1978. It was a critical and commercial disappointment that only charted at number 84 in the US. This album is now available as a three-album set on two CDs with Stills & Illegal Stills, having never been released on its own on CD.

Content 
In a radio interview at the time, Stills said he worked extremely hard on the album, and there were 12-inch mixes of "Can't Get No Booty" ready to be released. He recorded some disco tracks after playing percussion on the Bee Gees' "You Should Be Dancing", and subsequently hired their arranger Mike Lewis and used the group members' younger brother Andy Gibb on backing vocals.

Stephen Stills described the record as "disco and swamp rock". Stills said the song "Thoroughfare Gap" was him drawing upon his history, and

George Terry is quoted as saying he thinks it's about Neil Young's Lionel Trains.

Stills said about the perceived negative reception of going disco that "there are elements of disco I like - the percussion and the guitar. I have played on so many Bee Gees songs: I don't know which ones I played on and which ones I didn't. 'Cause Barry (Gibb) is an old friend of mine and I just sat in and played a chickum-chit, chickum-chit, a little wacka-wacka guitar, then said, 'Use 'em or don't use 'em, I had a great time. You don't even have to use my name.'"

He continued on Thoroughfare Gap: "Maybe some of the tunes weren't as good as others I've written but I am just messing around trying to find something new. I can't do the same thing for eight years. That's called artistic suicide."

Stills said he recorded "Not Fade Away" after seeing The Buddy Holly Story and went into the studio the next night to record it - "Kind of a combination of the Stones version and the original version".

The song "Thoroughfare Gap", dates back to 1972, with Chris Hillman remembering Manassas attempting to record it, but not being able to get the right take.

Reception 
Critical reception was mixed, but generally negative. In a contemporary review, People magazine said  "Stills succeeds handsomely in soldering his Southern Cal rock (scorching guitar, lavish harmonies, introspective lyrics) to an ultraswayed disco feel (thudding drums, Caribbean cowbells, congas, high-volume strings and horns). Against great odds, it adds up to a fresh sound, thanks to stalwart studio work by drummer Joe Vitale, percussionist Joe Lala, bassist George "Chocolate" Perry and Eric Clapton's guitarist George Terry. Their efforts are particularly noteworthy on You Can't Dance Alone, What's the Game and Can't Get No Booty. Especially reassuring is the title track, an acoustic ballad with a haunting fiddle solo by Al Gould. It harks back to Stills' finest work over the years, songs like Helplessly Hoping, 4 and 20 and As I Come of Age." Trouser Press, in a largely negative review, called the songwriting "monotonous" and said he was enthusiastically "trying to renovate his sound for today's scene". They did have praise for "Thoroughfare Gap", but still noted that it was six years old, saying it was the only the song that had "the folksy funk style that once made him worthwhile". Record World said Stills was experimenting, and "You Can't Dance Alone" was geared for the Top 40.

In support of this album Stills formed the California Blues Band and toured throughout most of 1979.

Track listing

Personnel 

 Stephen Stills – vocals, guitars (1, 3-10), percussion (1), horn and string arrangements (1, 4-8), acoustic guitar (2), bass (2, 10), synthesizers (3), Moog synthesizer (7), organ (9), acoustic piano (10)
 Mike Finnigan – acoustic piano (1, 3, 6, 8), organ (7), backing vocals (8)
 Paul Harris – acoustic piano (2)
 Kenny Kirkland – acoustic piano (5)
 Albhy Galuten – acoustic piano (7)
 Joey Murcia – guitars (1)
 George Terry – guitars (3, 5, 7)
 Gerry Tolman – guitars (6)
 Danny Kortchmar – guitars (10), percussion (10), backing vocals (10)
 George Perry – bass (1, 3-6, 8, 9), backing vocals (8, 9)
 Gerald Johnson – bass (7)
 Joe Vitale –drums (1, 3-6, 8, 9, 10), backing vocals (9)
 Paul Lee – drums (2)
 Richard O'Connell – drums (7)
 Joe Lala – percussion (1, 3, 6, 10)
 Al Gould – fiddle (2)
 Whit Sidener – flutes (3)
 Mike Lewis – horn and string arrangements (1, 4-8), flute arrangements (3)
 Andy Gibb – backing vocals (1, 5)
 Dave Mason – backing vocals (1, 5, 6)
 John Sambataro – backing vocals (1, 3, 5)
 Brooks Hunnicutt – backing vocals (8)
 Kitty Pritikin (aka Kitty Woodson Terry) – backing vocals (name misprint) (8)
 Verna Richardson – backing vocals (8)
 Lisa Roberts – backing vocals (8)

Production 
 Stephen Stills – producer, album design 
 Howard Albert – producer, engineer 
 Ron Albert – producer, engineer 
 Michael Braunstein – engineer, recording (4, 6-9)
 Steve Gursky – engineer 
 Mike Fuller – mastering at Criteria Studios
 John Berg – album design 
 Jim McCrary – photography 
 Michael John Bowen – management

Special thanks to Guillerma Giachetti, Gerry Tolman, Armando Hurley, Harper Dance, Home At Last

Charts

Tour 

Stephen Stills California Blues Band Tour 1979 was a concert tour by American musician Stephen Stills. It was in support of his 1978 album Thoroughfare Gap. During the tour he also recorded another album that was rejected by his record label, many songs from this projected album were played on this tour. On this tour Stills was backed by his group the California Blues Band. The 1979 run at The Roxy, Los Angeles, was professionally recorded.

Stephen Stills and the California Blues Band
 Stephen Stills – guitar, percussion, vocals
 Dallas Taylor – drums (Roxy Theater 1979 only)
 Mike Finnigan – keyboards, Vocals
 Joe Lala – percussion, vocals
 Billy Meeker – drums
 Michael Sturgis – guitar
 Trey Thompson – bass
 Bonnie Bramlett – vocals
 Graham Nash – appeared during some dates of the European 1980 tour
Typical setlist

All songs written by Stephen Stills, except where noted.

 "Precious Love"
 "For What It's Worth"
 "You Can't Dance Alone"
 "Cuba Al Fin"
 "Go Back Home"
 "How Wrong Can You Be" (Mike Finnigan)
 "Love The One You're With"
 "Make Love To You"
 "Cherokee"
 "Rock And Roll Crazies/Cuban Bluegrass" (Stills, Dallas Taylor/ Stills, Joe Lala)
 "Jet Set (Sigh)"
 "Thoroughfare Gap"
 Come On In My Kitchen (Robert Johnson)

References 

Stephen Stills albums
1978 albums
Columbia Records albums